Abraham Koiyan Morlu (born May 5, 1981) is a Liberian former Canadian football wide receiver. He was signed as a street free agent by the Charlotte Stars in 2008. Morlu has also been a member of the Winnipeg Blue Bombers and Toronto Argonauts.

Morlu has also competed in track and field, representing his birth country Liberia. He specialized in the sprints, and competed internationally at the  2010 World Indoor Championships without reaching the final. He also competed in the 4 x 100 metres relay at the 2000 Olympic Games, the 2001 World Championships and the 2003 World Championships.

References

1981 births
Living people
Liberian players of American football
Charlotte 49ers football players
Canadian football wide receivers
Winnipeg Blue Bombers players
Toronto Argonauts players
Liberian male sprinters
Athletes (track and field) at the 2000 Summer Olympics
Olympic athletes of Liberia
World Athletics Championships athletes for Liberia